This is a list of people elected Fellow of the Royal Society in 2004.

Fellows 

Samson Abramsky
Spencer Charles Hilton Barrett
Julian Besag
Timothy Robert Birkhead
Martin Bobrow
Donal Donat Conor Bradley
Malcolm Watson Brown
Charles Richard Arthur Catlow
Graeme Milbourne Clark
Gordon Richard Conway
Lennox Cowie
Anthony George Cullis
Partha Sarathi Dasgupta
Nicholas Edward Day
Caroline Dean
Graham John Dockray
Richard Michael Durbin
David Bernard Alper Epstein
Gerard Ian Evan
Bland James Finlay
Norman Andrew Fleck
Carlos Silvestre Frenk
Vernon Charles Gibson
Lynn Faith Gladden
Bryan Thomas Grenfell
Stephen Edgar Halford
Andrew David Hamilton
Edward Hinds
David William Holden
David Thomas Kemp
Malcolm Sim Longair
Alan Douglas Martin
John Francis Brake Mitchell
William Branks Motherwell
David Preiss
John Adrian Pyle
Carol Vivien Robinson
Nancy Jane Rothwell
Frank Sherwood Rowland
David Henry Solomon
Peter Henry St George Hyslop
Christopher Brian Stringer
David Tollervey
Nicholas John Wald
Dale Brian Wigley

Foreign members

Karl Frank Austen
Peter Martin Goldreich
Jane Lubchenco
Elliot Martin Meyerowitz
Michele Parrinello

References

2004
2004 in science
2004 in the United Kingdom